The 11th Maneuver Division (hanja: 十一機動師團), also known as Flowering Knights Division (hanja: 花郞部隊), is a military formation of the Republic of Korea Army and is unit is one of four divisions under the command of the VII Maneuver Corps. Before the unit was renamed on January 1, 2021, it was called the 11th Mechanized Infantry Division.

History
The 11th Maneuver Division was established in Yeongcheon on August 27, 1950, during the Korean War. It is also a unit that caused the massacre of geochang civilians under the order of Choe Deok-sin, who was the division commander of the 11th Division in February 1951. In the Korean War, the 11th Division fought mainly on the eastern front, such as Mt. Seorak and Hyangrobong. After the end of the Korean War, the military base was moved to Hwacheon.

At the time of the Gangneung submarine infiltration incident in 1996, the 11th Infantry Division was deployed with the 2nd Infantry Division to fight, and one soldier from the 11th Infantry Division was killed during the battle.

Organization
Three specialized divisions were designated for the Army under the Army Division Specialization Plan established in 1967, of which the 11th Infantry Division was converted to a landing division for landing operations on January 23, 1968, but later returned to the general infantry division when the Army's specialized division system was suspended. In 2004, the 11th Infantry Division became the fifth South Korean Army unit to be reorganized into a mechanized unit. As of December 1, 2016, the 11th Mechanized Infantry Division was incorporated as a subordinate unit of the VII Maneuver Corps, and was subsequently reorganized into a subordinate unit directly under Ground Operations Command under the integration plan of 1st Operations Command and 3rd Operations Command. The 20th Mechanized Infantry Division, which was disbanded on November 29, 2019, was merged into the 11th Mechanized Infantry Division. On 1 January 2021, the 11th Mechanized Infantry Division was renamed the 11th Maneuver Division.

 Headquarters:
 Engineer Battalion
 Intelligence Battalion
 Support Battalion
 Armored Reconnaissance Battalion
 Medical Battalion
 Signal Battalion
 CBR Battalion
 Air Defense Battalion
 Military Police Battalion
 Replacement Company
 Headquarters Company
 9th Mechanized Infantry Brigade
 9th Brigade Headquarters and Headquarters Company
 56th Tank Battalion (K2)
 127th Mechanized Infantry Battalion (K21)
 128th Mechanized Infantry Battalion (K21)
 Support Battalion
 13th Mechanized Infantry Brigade
 13th Brigade Headquarters and Headquarters Company
 36th Tank Battalion (K2)
 112th Mechanized Infantry Battalion (K21)
 129th Mechanized Infantry Battalion (K21)
 Support Battalion
 61st Mechanized Infantry Brigade
 61st Brigade Headquarters and Headquarters Company
 12th Tank Battalion (K2)
 108th Mechanized Infantry Battalion (K21)
 111th Mechanized Infantry Battalion (K21)
 Support Battalion
 Division Artillery Brigade
 Division Artillery Brigade Headquarters and Headquarters Battery
 55th Artillery Battalion (K9 155mm)
 78th Artillery Battalion (K9 155mm)
 91st Artillery Battalion (K9 155mm)
 955th Artillery Battalion (K9 155mm)
 Multiple Rocket Artillery Battalion (K239 Chunmoo)

Unit of the VII Maneuver Corps 
Capital Mechanized Infantry Division
2nd Quick Response Division
8th Maneuver Division

See also 
Republic of Korea Army

References

InfDiv0008
InfDiv0008SK
Military units and formations established in 1950
Yeongcheon
Hongcheon County